Grevillea sphacelata, also known as the grey spider flower, is a species of flowering plant in the family Proteaceae and is endemic to the eastern New South Wales. It is a spreading or erect shrub with narrowly linear to oblong leaves and clusters of hairy, pale brown and pink flowers.

Description
The upper surface of the leaves is glabrous and the lower surface is silky-hairy. The flowers are arranged in umbel-like clusters, the flowers at the ends of the clusters flowering first.

Taxonomy
Grevillea sphacelata was first formally described in 1810 by Robert in Transactions of the Linnean Society of London. The specific epithet (sphacelata) means "having brown or blackish speckles".

Distribution and habitat
Grey spider flower grows in woodland and heath, mainly on the Woronora Plateau but generally in the Sydney Basin and south to Dapto, west to Mittagong, with a disjunct population between Nowra, Huskisson and Wandandian on the south coast of New South Wales.

See also
List of Grevillea species

References

sphacelata
Proteales of Australia
Endemic flora of Australia
Flora of New South Wales
Taxa named by Robert Brown (botanist, born 1773)
Plants described in 1810